This is a list of diplomatic missions of Cape Verde, excluding honorary consulates. Cape Verde has a small number of diplomatic missions.

Current missions

Africa

Americas

Asia

Europe

Multilateral organizations

Gallery

Embassy to open
 (Jerusalem)

Closed missions

Asia

Europe

See also
 Foreign relations of Cape Verde
 List of diplomatic missions in Cape Verde
 Visa policy of Cape Verde

References

Embassy of Cape Verde in Brasilia, Brasil
Embassy of Cape Verde in Lisbon, Portugal
Embassy of Cape Verde in Washington DC, USA

Cape Verde
Diplomatic missions